On June 16, 2015, shortly after midnight, five Irish J-1 visa students and one Irish-American died and seven others were injured after a balcony on which they were standing collapsed. The group was celebrating a 21st birthday party in Berkeley, California. The balcony was on the 5th floor of an apartment building at 2020 Kittredge Street in Berkeley, then called Library Gardens. The district attorney of Alameda County launched a criminal probe into the incident. In January 2022, one of the injured died from a stroke related to the injuries. 

In June 2015, Mayor Tom Bates of Berkeley promised a wide-ranging investigation into the cause of the accident. The evidence is overwhelming that dry rot from improper construction caused the collapse, not the weight of the 13 students. 

Although, as the immediate aftermath photos show, the proximate cause was dry rot, which is caused by excessive moisture intrusion into the supporting wood framing, undermining its structural integrity, the only known investigation report fails to definitively identify the source of moisture, its entry route(s), or the mechanism(s) of its transport. It simply lists 11 "factors which appear to have contributed" without discussion of their relative importance, whether any of the factors was a necessary condition, or which combination of factors were sufficient. The report's format further obfuscates with extensive redactions (some of which are incomplete and thus gratuitous) and by publishing only a poor-quality scan of printouts of the reports. Architect Robert Perry, the author of the as-built vs. as-designed report, focuses exclusively on rainwater entry into the building envelope, and makes observations that appear to be at odds with the evidence. For example, he claims that "dry rot damage [in the collapsed balcony] had occurred along the top of the cantilever balcony deck joists". But the immediate post-collapse photos show that these joists had already disintegrated to the point that they were unidentifiable. Furthermore, he fails to address strong evidence for vapor transport within the building envelope resulting in concealed condensation in the deck's joist cavities. The deck was on the north-facing wall of the building, and has little or no sun exposure for most of the year. The deck joists, made of an engineered wood product known as laminated veneer lumber, were fully enclosed on its exterior surfaces by vapor barrier membranes, yet open to the main building's joist cavities. The deck's joist cavity temperature is dominated by exposure to the outdoor environment, while the interior joist cavity temperature is dominated by the conditioned spaces sandwiched above and below, the latter being warmer most of the time. This configuration causes the deck's joist cavities to condense water vapor supplied by the interior and retain it as liquid, creating optimum conditions for the growth of wood-destroying fungus commonly called dry rot.

Two independent and detailed reviews of the structural design found no deficiencies in the deck's load-bearing capacity. As designed and built, and absent the dry rot, the deck would have easily supported itself and the 13 people. But with the joists rotted to powder, the only remaining strength was in the ceramic enclosure, which consisted of the unreinforced concrete deck and stucco soffit and walls. The resulting ceramic box beam, devoid of its former LVL joists, and not intended as a structural support, was vulnerable to brittle failure without warning. 

Pre-collapse exterior views of the collapsed fifth-floor balcony and the identical fourth-floor balcony are available in Google Street View.

Victims
Six people died in the immediate aftermath of the collapse. They were identified as 22-year-old Ashley Donohoe, and Olivia Burke, Eoghan Culligan, Niccolai "Nick" Schuster, Lorcán Miller and Eimear Walsh, all aged 21. All six were Irish and from Dublin. On 2 January 2022, survivor Aoife Beary died of a stroke, the consequence of injuries sustained in the collapse.

Investigation
Alameda County prosecutors opened up an investigation in the accident on June 25. They stated that involuntary manslaughter charges could be filed. On that day, District Attorney Nancy O'Malley denied that pressure from the Irish community led to the collapse inquiry. On July 3, 2015, the Alameda County Superior Court rejected a restraining order bid by Segue Builders, a construction company, against the examination of evidence. O'Malley had argued the granting of a restraining order would interfere with her duty to investigate the tragedy.

Funerals
A joint funeral service for Olivia Burke and her cousin Ashley Donohoe took place on June 20, four days after the collapse, in a church in Cotati, California. Funeral services were held in Dublin for the other victims.

Litigation
In December 2015 a court was told that the collapse happened because contractors cut corners to save costs and that the management company for the building, Greystar Real Estate Partners, ignored a "red flag" when students who rented the apartment complained about mushrooms growing on the balcony. Legal cases by some of the victims were set to be combined and heard together. By the end of 2017 it was reported that most of the lawsuits had been settled.

References

2015 disasters in the United States
2015 in California
21st century in Berkeley, California
Building collapses in 2015
Ireland–United States relations
Building collapses in the United States